This is a list of some of the more notable people excommunicated by the Catholic Church. It includes only excommunications acknowledged or imposed by a decree of the Pope or a bishop in communion with him. Latae sententiae excommunications, those that automatically affect classes of people (members of certain associations or those who perform actions such as directly violating the seal of confession or carrying out an abortion), are not listed unless confirmed by a bishop or ecclesiastical tribunal with respect to certain individuals.

In Roman Catholic canon law, excommunication is a censure and thus a "medicinal penalty" intended to invite the person to change behavior or attitude that incurred the penalty, repent, and return to full communion. Excommunication severs one from communion with the Church; excommunicated Catholics are forbidden from receiving any sacrament and refused a Catholic burial, but are still bound by canonical obligations such as attending Mass or fasting seasonally. Excommunicated Catholics, however, are barred from receiving the Eucharist or from taking an active part in the liturgy (reading, bringing the offerings, etc.).

Henry IV, Holy Roman Emperor, with 5 separate excommunications from 3 different Popes, carries the distinction of publicly being the most excommunicated individual.

1st century
Simon Magus, for whom simony was named
An unnamed Corinthian who had married a woman who had been his father's wife
Hymenaeus and Alexander, excommunicated by Saint Paul the Apostle  as recounted in 1 Timothy

2nd century
Valentinus, proponent of Gnosticism
Marcion of Sinope, originator of Marcionism, excommunicated by Pope Pius I
Montanus, originator of Montanism
Theodotus of Byzantium, proponent of Adoptionism, excommunicated by Pope Victor I

3rd century
Sabellius, originator of Sabellianism
Novatian, an early antipope who taught Novatianism
Paul of Samosata, excommunicated by a synod at Antioch in 269
Marcellus of Ancyra
Felicissimus, deacon of Carthage, was excommunicated by St Cyprian, bishop of Carthage. Cyprian was in hiding at the time from persecution and he sent people to distribute alms to those hurt by the persecutions. Felicissimus tried to frustrate the efforts of those distributing alms as he saw it as an encroachment on his office.

4th century

Arius, founder of Arianism
Celestius, Early Arian Leader
Roman Emperor Theodosius I was excommunicated by the bishop of Milan, Saint Ambrose, for the Massacre of Thessaloniki. After repentance, penance and restitution, the Emperor was restored to communion with the Church.
Supporters of Antipope Ursicinus were excommunicated by a Roman synod after they accused Pope Damasus I of adultery in a Roman court in 378.
Auxentius of Milan, an Arian bishop, was excommunicated by the Roman synod of 369.

5th century
Nestorius, proponent of Nestorianism
Eutyches, proponent of Monophysitism, along with his monastery, was excommunicated by Flavian of Constantinople
Dioscorus I of Alexandria, who presided over the robber council of Ephesus
John of Antioch and his party by the Council of Ephesus
Peter the Tanner, Patriarch of Antioch was excommunicated by Pope Felix III at a synod in Rome for heresy 
Peter Mongus, Patriarch of Alexandria was excommunicated by Pope Felix III
Acacius, Patriarch of Constantinople was excommunicated by Pope Felix III on account of his receiving the excommunicated Peter Mongus into communion. This led to the Acacian schism.
Papal legates that were sent by Pope Felix III to Constantinople were excommunicated by Pope Felix III. They were sent to call Acacius to explain his conduct and urge the Byzantine Emperor to depose Peter Mongus from his see. After being imprisoned and threatened after arriving at Constantinople, they caved in and held communion with heretics, which led to the Pope excommunicating them.
Monks in Constantinople were excommunicated by Nestorius, Archbishop of Constantinople, on account of their opposition to Nestorius's teachings. This took place before Nestorius himself was excommunicated by the Council of Ephesus. The monks appealed to the Emperor Theodosius II to help them against Nestorius, who later summoned the Council of Ephesus.
Ibas of Edessa was excommunicated by the Robber Council of Ephesus in 449. This council and its decisions were themselves overturned two years later at the Council of Chalcedon.
Theodoret, bishop of Cyrrhus, was excommunicated by the Robber Council of Ephesus. This council and its decisions were themselves overturned two years later at the Council of Chalcedon.
Pope Leo I was excommunicated by Dioscorus, Patriarch of Alexandria and ten bishops. Pope Leo would later excommunicate Dioscorus and all others who participated in the Robber Council of Ephesus.
Classicianus a Roman official was excommunicated along with his entire household by a bishop named Auxilius after he had entered a church to seize several perjurers. Classicianus wrote afterwards to Augustine of Hippo to intercede for him with Auxilius. Augustine then wrote to Auxilius on Classicianus's behalf.

6th century
St Columba was excommunicated in 562 by the synod of Teltown for allegedly praying for the winning side in an Irish War. The excommunication was later held to be an abuse of justice and the bishops in question removed their charge.
The sons of Conall mac Domnaill by St Columba some time in the late 6th century, due to their persecution of churches 
Theodore of Mopsuestia by the Second Council of Constantinople

7th century
Pyrrhus of Constantinople was excommunicated 648 by Pope Theodore I and a synod of bishops after he had gone back on his recantation of monothelitism. The Pope and the bishops also declared him deposed from being Patriarch of Constantinople. Theodore reportedly signed the excommunication upon St Peter's tomb using ink that was mingled with drops of the Blessed Sacrament.
Paul II of Constantinople was excommunicated and deposed from his see in 649 by Pope Theodore I after the patriarch had professed Monothelitism.
Pope Honorius I was posthumously named as excommunicated by the Third Council of Constantinople and by Pope Leo II in a 682 letter to the Byzantine Emperor Constantine IV
John Philoponus was posthumously named excommunicated by the Third Council of Constantinople. He was condemned by the council as being a 'tritheist'

8th century
The heretic preachers Adalbert and Clement by a council headed by St Boniface in 745. Adelbert's excommunication was not upheld by Rome, however, although Clement's was.
The second council of Nicaea excommunicated a number of people by name who had lived in previous times, some of whom had been already condemned previously, including: Arius and all who follow him, Macedonius I of Constantinople, Nestorius and those who followed him, Eutyches, Dioscorus, Severus of Antioch and Peter the Fuller along with those with them, Origen, Didymus the blind, Evagrius Ponticus, as well as Sergius I of Constantinople, Pyrrhus of Constantinople, Pope Honorius I, Cyrus of Alexandria, Macarius I of Antioch  along with their followers
A diaconissa named Epiphania was excommunicated by a synod held in Rome in 721 that dealt with the issue of illicit conjugal relations

9th century
The fourth Council of Constantinople excommunicated by name and upheld a number of previous excommunications of previous councils of a number of people who had died in previous centuries. Those names in this list were: Arius (all those who followed his teachings were excommunicated with him),  Macedonius I of Constantinople, Nestorius, Eutyches, Dioscorus, Severus of Antioch, Peter the Fuller, Zoharas the Syrian, Origen, Theodore of Mopsuestia, Didymus the Blind, Evagrius Ponticus, Theodere of Pharan, Sergius I of Constantinople, Pyrrhus of Constantinople, Peter of Constantinople, Paul II of Constantinople, Pope Honorius I, Cyrus of Alexandria, Macarius I of Antioch and his disciple Stephen, Anastasius of Constantinople, Constantine II of Constantinople, Nicetas I of Constantinople, Theodosius III of Ephesus, Sisinnius Pastilas, Basil Tricacabus, Theodoret, Anthony and John (priests of Constantinople) and Theodore Krithinos.  Photios I of Constantinople was also named as excommunicated by the council.
John VII, Archbishop of Ravenna was excommunicated by Pope Nicholas I for various crimes, including the forging of documents to support claims against the Roman See, making unjust demands on suffragan bishops for money, illegally imprisoning priests and maltreating papal legates. He later submitted to the Pope at the Roman synod in 861. But he was then subsequently excommunicated a second time after he entered into a pact with the excommunicated Archbishops of Trier and Cologne. He then submitted again to the Pope after this second excommunication.
Ingiltrud, wife of Boso the Elder, Count of Turin, was excommunicated by bishops in the empire of Charles the Bald at the direction of Pope Nicholas I after she left her husband for a secret lover and didn't respond to a summons to appear before the Synod of Milan in 860.
Judith of Flanders, Frankish princess and daughter of Charles the Bald was excommunicated by Frankish bishops after she married Baldwin I, Margrave of Flanders without her father's consent.
Photios I, Patriarch of Constantinople was excommunicated by Pope Nicholas I in 863 on grounds that he had raised himself to the Patriarchal See illegally in violation of church law. He had been ordained bishop by Gregory Asbestas, who was already excommunicated， he hadn't waited the mandatory waiting period for ordination between different orders (see: Interstices (Catholicism)) and Ignatios of Constantinople was considered to still be the Patriarch of Constantinople. He was named as excommunicated in the 869-870 Fourth Council of Constantinople. When Ignatios of Constantinople died in 877, Pope John VIII agreed to restore him to communion and confirm him as Patriarch of Constantinople. However, he was excommunicated again by Pope John after he held a synod in 879 that attempted to revoke the acts of the Fourth Council of Constantinople. 
Gregory Asbestas was excommunicated by Patriarch Ignatios of Constantinople on account of insubordination.
Rodoald of Porto and Zachary of Anagni, were excommunicated by Pope Nicholas I in 863 at a synod in the Lateran. The two men had served as Papal legates to Constantinople with direction to hear the two sides  in the dispute between Photius and Ignatius, who both claimed to be rightful Patriarchs of Constantinople. They received bribes and passed a ruling in the Pope's name in favour of Photius.
Gunther, Archbishop of Cologne and Thietgaud, Archbishop of Trier, were excommunicated by Pope Nicholas I at a synod in October 863. The two bishops had given approval for the divorce and remarriage of King Lothair II. Gunther's excommunication was lifted in 869 by Pope Adrian II after Gunther made a public retraction but his clerical status was not restored and he was given a status of lay communion

10th century
In 998, Robert II of France, who had been insisting on his right to appoint bishops, was ultimately forced to back down, and ultimately also to put aside his wife Bertha of Burgundy who had also been excommunicated. The stated reason was the degree of consanguinity between the two. Excommunicated by Pope Gregory V. They had the marriage annulled by Pope Sylvester II in 1000 and were reinstated.

11th century
Michael Cerularius, Ecumenical Patriarch of Constantinople, along with Leo of Ohrid and their adherents, were excommunicated in 1054 after he had erased the Pope's name from church diptychs and made accusations against the western church of being in heresy. The excommunication was carried out by legates of Pope Leo IX after the Pope's death. This excommunication was only directed at these individuals named and not at the wider eastern church; the legates specifically made note that they considered the wider eastern church to remain pious and orthodox. However, in the ensuing years, most of the eastern bishops followed Cerularius and also ceased recognition of the Pope by striking his name from their diptychs. This led to the East–West Schism. The legal validity of this excommunication has been questioned as it was issued by legates of Pope Leo IX after the Pope's death. It was declared lifted on 7 December 1965.
Henry IV, Holy Roman Emperor was excommunicated 4 times in the 11th century (and would later be excommunicated a fifth time in the 12th century). He was excommunicated by Pope Gregory VII three separate times, and once more by Pope Urban II. The first was on 22 February 1076 over the Investiture Controversy. This excommunication was lifted on 28 January 1077 after Henry's public show of penitence known as the Road to Canossa. His second excommunication by Gregory was on 7 March 1080, and the third was in 1084 or 1085. Urban II excommunicated Henry in 1088.
Harold II, King of England, for perhaps politically motivated reasons by Pope Alexander II in order to justify the invasion and takeover of the kingdom by William the Conqueror in 1066.
Bolesław II the Generous, Duke of Poland, was excommunicated in 1080 after murdering the bishop Saint Stanislaus of Kraków.
Philip I of France, king of France, for repudiating his marriage and remarrying, by Hugh, Archbishop of Lyon and later reaffirmed by Pope Urban II.
Bishops in France, under orders of Benedict VIII, excommunicated feudal barons who had seized property belonging to the monastery of Cluny in 1016 
The bishop of Autun excommunicated Cluniac monks in his diocese who took over the monastery of Vezelay without his permission; the excommunication was removed after they left the diocese 
In 1031 the council of Limoges in France excommunicated feudal barons in the diocese of Limoges who were conducting private warfare between themselves in the midst of widespread famine and pestilence that was killing off a large portion of the peasantry. The famine and pestilence were thought to be punishments from God for grave sins being committed close to the millennium anniversary of Christ's death and resurrection. The members of the council dashed their candles to the ground in unison after calling out 'As these lights are extinguished before your eyes, so let their joy be extinguished before the angels.' 
Heribert, Archbishop of Milan, was excommunicated by Pope Benedict IX when he was at enmity with him.
Arialdo was excommunicated by Guido da Velate, bishop of Milan while he was working against clerical abuses in Milan. He was immediately reinstated by Pope Stephen IX
Guido da Velate, bishop of Milan was excommunicated because of repeated lapses in his failure to reform

12th century
Frederick I Barbarossa, Holy Roman Emperor, by Alexander III
Anselm V (Archbishop of Milan) by Pope Honorius II
William I of Sicily, by Pope Adrian IV, while the king was waging war against the papal states and raiding pilgrims on their way to the tombs of the apostles.
Ralph I, Count of Vermandois was said to have been excommunicated in 1142 by Bishop Saint Ivo of Chartres for repudiating his lawful wife and marrying another
Roger II of Sicily, was excommunicated under the decrees of the Second Lateran Council in 1139
Anacletus II, antipope
Henry IV, Holy Roman Emperor, excommunicated by Pope Paschal II in 1106 for refusing to abjure his claim to imperial investitures, posthumously lifted in 1111. (Henry IV had already been excommunicated four times in the 11th century.)
Henry V, Holy Roman Emperor by Jordan, Archbishop of Milan in 1116 and ratified by Pope Paschal II over the Investiture Controversy. He was excommunicated again by Pope Gelasius II and Pope Callistus II for setting up and supporting Antipope Gregory VIII. Received back into communion in 1122 or thereabouts.
Mauritius Burdinus, Archbishop of Braga, was excommunicated for crowning Henry V as Holy Roman Emperor at Rome during Henry's invasion of Italy during the Investiture Controversy in 1117 by Pope Paschal II. He was excommunicated a second time in 1118 when after Paschal II died, Pope Gelasius II was elected and Henry established Archbishop Mauritius as Antipope Gregory VIII in opposition to him.
In 1170 Archbishop of Canterbury Thomas Becket excommunicated Roger de Pont L'Évêque, the archbishop of York, along with Gilbert Foliot, the bishop of London, and Josceline de Bohon, the bishop of Salisbury, for crowning the heir-apparent Henry at York, thereby usurping Canterbury's privileges. In response to these excommunications, the heirs father, Henry II of England famously exclaimed words that led to Becket's assassination.
In 1171, Pope Alexander III excommunicated Reginald FitzUrse, Hugh de Morville, William de Tracy and Richard le Breton for the murder of Thomas Becket. They later did penance to the Pope in Rome who ordered them to join the crusade in the Holy Land in reparation.
 The Third Lateran Council excommunicated the Cathars and mercenary groups that were plaguing Europe at the time
Markwuld of Anweiler, Imperial Seneschal in the Holy Roman Empire, was excommunicated by Pope Innocent III after he failed to return the Romagna and the March of Ancona to the Papal States

13th century
King John of England, excommunicated in 1208 by Pope Innocent III after refusing to accept Cardinal Stephen Langdon as the pope's choice for Archbishop of Canterbury. John relented in 1213 and was restored to communion.
King Afonso II of Portugal, excommunicated in 1212 by Pope Honorius III for weakening the clergy and investing part of the large sums destined to the Catholic Church in the unification of the country. Afonso II promised to reconcile with the Church, however, he died in 1223 without making any serious attempt to do so.
King Andrew II of Hungary, was excommunicated in 1231 after not following the points of Golden Bull of 1222, a seminal bill of rights, which contained new dispositions related to the tithe and hostile practices against the Jews and Muslims of the realm.
Frederick II, Holy Roman Emperor, was excommunicated three times. The first time by Pope Gregory IX in 1227 for delaying his promise to begin the 5th Crusade; the excommunication was lifted in 1229. The same pope excommunicated him again in 1239 for making war against the Papal States, a censure rescinded by the new pope, Celestine IV, who died soon after. Frederick was again excommunicated by Pope Innocent IV at the First Council of Lyons in 1245. Frederick repented just before his death and was absolved of the censure in 1250.
a number of clerics and prominent lay people in the German church were excommunicated by Papal legate Albert von Behaim after they had proved negligent in carrying out the needed measures to make the sentence of 1239 excommunication against Frederick II, Holy Roman Emperor effective 
Gilbert de Clare, 7th Earl of Gloucester was excommunicated in 1264 by Pope Clement IV for rebelling against King Henry III of England during the Second Barons' War. This was lifted in 1268.
King Ladislaus IV of Hungary in 1279, by the pope's envoy Philip, for acting against the Catholic Church and living in a pagan way with the Cumans.
James II of Aragon, in 1286 by Pope Boniface VIII for being crowned King of Sicily and thereby usurping a papal fief. His younger brother Frederick III of Sicily was excommunicated for the same reason in 1296.
Jacopo Colonna and Pietro Colonna, both cardinals, were excommunicated by Pope Boniface VIII in the bull 'excelso throno' (1297) for refusing to surrender their relative Stefano Colonna (who had seized and robbed the pope's nephew) and refusing to give the pope Palestrina along with two fortresses, which threatened the pope. This excommunication was extended in the same year to Jacopo's nephews and their heirs, after the two Colonna cardinals denounced the pope's election as invalid and appealed to a general council.
Eric VI of Denmark in 1298, by Pope Boniface VIII, for imprisoning Archbishop of Lund, Jens Grand.
Byzantine Emperor Michael VIII Palaiologos of Constantinople, by Pope Martin IV.
Peter III of Aragon, by Pope Martin IV
Raymond VI, Count of Toulouse was excommunicated by Pierre de Castelnau, legate of Pope Innocent III in 1207 for refusing to persecute Albigensians in his lands and even showing them signs of favour, such as allowing them to preach in front of him. He later did penance and joined in the crusade against the Albigensians, but was excommunicated again in 1209 when he went to Toulouse and tried to elude his obligations.
the people of Toulouse were excommunicated by the Council of Avignon in 1209 for failing to expel the Albigensians from their city.
Otto IV, Holy Roman Emperor was excommunicated by Pope Innocent III in 1210 after he had invaded and taken over lands belonging to the Papal States as well as invading the Kingdom of Sicily that was under the Pope's suzerainty.
Alfonso IX of León, King of Leon and Galicia, was excommunicated by Pope Innocent III for marrying a near relative.
Venetian crusaders in the fourth crusade that had diverted the purpose of the crusade away from the holy land and ended up sacking Constantinople instead were excommunicated by Pope Innocent III
Robert Grosseteste, Bishop of Lincoln was excommunicated by monks of Canterbury Cathedral in 1243, during a time period when there was a vacancy in the see of Canterbury.

14th century
Antipopes at Avignon Clement VII and Benedict XIII and their followers by proxy.
Barnabò Visconti, tyrant of Milan, by Blessed Urban V in 1363. This was later rescinded after Barnabo restored castles he had seized and peace was concluded between him and the papal states. He was again excommunicated by Pope Gregory XI after he took over Reggio and other places that were feudatory to the Holy See in 1371. Barnabo reportedly forced the papal legates who brought him the bull of excommunication to eat the parchment on which it was written.
the inhabitants of Florence were collectively excommunicated by Pope Gregory XI after they conspired with the excommunicated Barnabò Visconti, tyrant of Milan, in 1375 to stir up the inhabitants of the Papal states against the French legates that Pope Gregory had sent to rule them in his place, since Gregory lived in Avignon. Florence sent Catherine of Siena to intercede for them with the Pope and she successfully convinced the Pope to leave Avignon and return to Rome.
Mercenary bands known as the 'free companies' that had overrun Italy and France were excommunicated by Blessed Urban V in 1366. Included in this excommunication were the German Count of Landau and the Englishman Sir John Hawkwood.
Pedro the Cruel of Navarre was excommunicated by Blessed Urban V for his persecutions of clergy and cruelty.
King Philip the Fair of France in 1303 by Pope Boniface VIII, for failing to respond adequately to a papal letter regarding Philip's effective rejection of the pope's temporal authority.
William of Littlington, an English Carmelite friar, in 1305; he was reconciled, after a four years' penance, in 1309.
Ladislaus Kán, Hungarian noble regent of the region of Transylvania that was excommunicated in 1309 by the pope's envoy Gentile Portino da Montefiore for not handing over the Holy Crown of Hungary, that was being kept illegally by him.
Matthew III Csák, Hungarian noble that was excommunicated in 1311 by the pope's envoy Gentile, for not accepting the new King Charles I of Hungary.
Robert the Bruce, King of Scots from 1306 to 1329, was excommunicated following his killing of John Comyn before the altar of the Greyfriars Church at Dumfries in 1306. His excommunication was lifted by Pope John XXII.
William de Lamberton, Bishop of St Andrews.
David de Moravia, Bishop of Moray.
Robert Wishart, Bishop of Glasgow.
Joanna I of Naples in 1378 by Pope Urban VI for her support of Antipope Clement VII, support deemed heretical by Urban.
All of the cardinals who voted for Antipope Clement VII were excommunicated by Urban VI.
John Wycliffe was posthumously excommunicated by the Council of Constance.
Angelo da Clareno and his group of Spiritual Franciscans were excommunicated by Pope John XXII in 1317.
the Spiritual Franciscans of Tuscany were excommunicated by Pope John XXII in 1317.
the Spiritual Franciscans of Provence were excommunicated by Guillaume d'Astre, Franciscan provincial superior.

15th century
Lorenzo De Medici and the city of Florence in 1478, after the papacy-backed Pazzi Conspiracy failed, for the hanging of Salviati in his vestial robes.
Jerome of Prague in 1409 by Zbyněk Zajíc of Hazmburk, Archbishop of Prague, for his role in the Czech Wycliffe campaign.
Pope Martin V in 1411 by Pope Gregory XII for supporting Pisan Antipope Alexander V and Antipope John XXIII.
Hussites founder Jan Hus by the Council of Constance in 1415.
Saint Joan of Arc by Bishop Pierre Cauchon on 30 May 1431 (even though he allowed her Holy Communion before her immolation). She was fully reconciled to the Catholic Church at her Trial of Nullification in 1456.
Antipope Felix V and his followers by Pope Eugene IV at the Council of Florence on 23 March 1440.
Bishop Pierre Cauchon in 1457 by Pope Callixtus III for his persecution and condemnation of Joan of Arc.
 The town of Prudnik in Silesia on 23 March 1464 by Pope Pius II for refusing to pay the debt of Duke Konrad IV the Older.
Girolamo Savonarola in 1497 by Pope Alexander VI.

16th century
Pietro Colonna in 1501 by Pope Alexander VI
James IV of Scotland in 1513 for breaking the Treaty of Perpetual Peace with England.
Martin Luther, the Protestant Reformer, in 1521 by Pope Leo X.
Henry VIII of England in 1533, officially promulgated on 17 December 1538 by Pope Paul III.
Thomas Cranmer, Archbishop of Canterbury and first Protestant Archbishop of Canterbury  of the Church of England.
Cardinal Odet de Coligny, on 31 March 1563, for professing the Calvinist faith.
Elizabeth I of England in 1570 by the papal bull Regnans in Excelsis.
Thomas Erastus, founder of Erastianism
Henry IV of France and Navarre, who famously retaliated by "excommunicating" the Pope.  He later converted to Catholicism and his excommunication was lifted on 17 September 1595.
Giovanni Bentivoglio, leader of Bologna, in 1506 by Julius II, while the pope was at war with him and leading an army to take Bologna.
Alfonso I d'Este, Duke of Ferrara, by Julius II in 1510.
Discalced Carmelites in Spain who participated in an illicit meeting to elect a provincial without approval, by the Pope's legate in Spain Filippo Sega in 1578 This was ignored by those excommunicated. It was formally revoked in 1579.
Carmelite nuns of the Monastery of the Encarnacion in Avila who refused to renounce St Teresa's leadership of the convent, by the orders provincial, after the church authorities ordered a replacement in 1577. This excommunication was revoked later that year.
Gérard Cauvin, father of Jean Calvin, was excommunicated by the chapter of the diocese of Noyon on account of him not sending in his accounts while he served as a procurator for the diocese.

17th century
Mikołaj Sapieha in approximately 1625 by Pope Urban VIII; punishment for stealing a painting. The excommunication was lifted in 1634 to allow Sapieha to publicly oppose the suggested marriage of Władysław IV Vasa and Princess Elizabeth of Bohemia.
Odoardo Farnese, Duke of Parma in 1641 by Pope Urban VIII during the Wars of Castro. He later reconciled with the Catholic Church and was readmitted to the Sacraments.
Priests Francisco de Jaca and Epiphane de Moirans in 1681 for opposing slavery in Cuba by their local bishop, however in 1686 the Holy Office under Pope Innocent XI formally agreed with a document they co-authored, which decried the slave trade.

18th century
Most important supporters of Jansenism, in the 1718 bull Pastoralis officii
Charles Maurice de Talleyrand-Périgord, Bishop of Autun, by Pope Pius VI. Before his death, Talleyrand was reconciled with the Catholic Church.

19th century
Napoleon was excommunicated in the 1809 bull Quum memoranda by Pope Pius VII for ordering the annexation of Rome and a long period of anti-Papal orders. Before Napoleon's death, his excommunication was lifted and he received the last rites.
Stephen Kaminski, bishop of the Polish National Catholic Church, in 1898
Francis Hodur, Roman Catholic priest (Scranton, Pennsylvania) and Prime Bishop of the Polish National Catholic Church
Gregorio Aglipay Cruz y Labayan was a Roman Catholic priest who became the first Filipino Supreme Bishop of the Philippine Independent Church, a new Protestant revolutionary-nationalist church, who would later become an Anglo-Catholic church. Excommunicated in May 1899 by Archbishop of Manila Bernardino Norzaleda y Villa  upon the expressed permission of Pope Leo XIII due to "usurpation of ecclesiastical jurisdiction" during the Philippine–American War.
Saint Mary MacKillop by Bishop Laurence Sheil in 1871. Five months later, from his deathbed, Shiel rescinded the excommunication.
Fr. Edward McGlynn was excommunicated in 1887 for opposing the establishment of parochial schools believing that they were unnecessary. The excommunication was lifted in 1892.
Fr. José María Morelos and Fr. Miguel Hidalgo y Costilla (both allegedly reconciled before their death) for "disturbances of the public order, corrupting the public, sacrilege [and] perjury" in 1810.
King Victor Emmanuel II of Italy was excommunicated by Pope Pius IX when the king successfully waged war against the Papal States, resulting in limiting the pope to Vatican City. Before Victor Emmanuel II's death his excommunication was lifted and he was permitted to take the last rites.
Charles Loyson (name as a Carmelite: Hyacinthe) was excommunicated in 1869 for leaving his religious order after refusing to retract his protest against the manner of convocation of the First Vatican Council.
Colombian writer and atheist José María Vargas Vila was excommunicated upon the publication his novel Ibis (1900).
Scientist Dr. Gregorio Chil y Naranjo was excommunicated in 1878 for his work on evolution in the Canary Islands entitled "Estudios historicos, climatologicos y patológicos de las Islas Canarias."  The Bishop of Barcelona, José María de Urquinaona y Vidot, declared the work "false, impious, scandalous, and heretical" and excommunicated the doctor.
Ignaz von Döllinger and Johann Friedrich were excommunicated by Gregor von Scherr, Archbishop of Munich and Freising on 18 April 1871, on account of their opposition to the doctrine of papal infallibility. This was part of the events in the creation of the Old Catholic Church
Joseph Hubert Reinkens, bishop in the Old Catholic Church, was excommunicated by Pope Pius IX on 9 November 1873
Bernhard Josef Hilgers, Joseph Langen, Franz Heinrich Reusch and Franz Peter Knoodt, theology professors at the University of Bonn were excommunicated by Cardinal Archbishop of Cologne, Paul Melchers in 1872 on account of their opposition to the doctrine of papal infallibility

20th century

All Catholics who participated in the creation of the Philippine Independent Church in the Philippines, in December 1902
Feliksa Kozłowska, Maria Michał Kowalski and the Mariavite movement in December 1906 by St Pius X
Alfred Loisy, a French cleric associated with modernism (1908?).
Father Romolo Murri, a leader of the Italian Catholic Democrats, for giving speeches against Papal policy (1909)
Marshal Josip Broz Tito (1946) and all Catholics who participated in the trial of Archbishop Aloysius Stepinac of Zagreb and the trial of Archbishop József Mindszenty of Hungary, which included most of the jury members.
Fr Michel Collin of France was excommunicated in 1951 for various heresies, and later declared himself Pope Clement XV.
Fr Leonard Feeney, SJ on 13 February 1953 for disobedience to the Holy See. Feeney promoted Feeneyism, a view condemned by the Catholic Church. Fr. Feeney was later reconciled to communion in the church without recanting his views.
Juan Perón, in 1955, after he signed a decree ordering the expulsion of Argentine bishops Manuel Tato and Ramón Novoa In 1963 Perón was reconciled with the Church and his excommunication lifted.
Plaquemines Parish President Leander Perez, Jackson G. Ricau (secretary of the Citizens Council of South Louisiana) and Mrs. B.J. Gaillot, Jr., president of Save Our Nation, Inc., on 16 April 1962 by Archbishop Joseph Rummel of the Archdiocese of New Orleans.  They were excommunicated for aggressively opposing the racial integration of Catholic schools in the Archdiocese starting in the 1963-64 school year.  Perez and Ricau were later reinstated into the Church following public retractions.
Archbishop Marcel Lefebvre, Bishops Antonio de Castro Meyer, Bernard Fellay, Bernard Tissier de Mallerais, Richard Williamson and Alfonso de Galarreta for the Ecône Consecrations (Society of St. Pius X) without papal mandate. Formally declared to have incurred latae sententiae excommunication by Cardinal Bernardin Gantin on 1 July 1988. The excommunications of the latter four (the bishops consecrated in that 1988 ceremony) were lifted in 2009; the first two (the consecrator and the co-consecrator) had died in the meantime. Williamson fell under a second excommunication after illicitly ordaining a bishop.
Members of multiple organizations in the Roman Catholic Diocese of Lincoln, Nebraska were excommunicated by Bishop Fabian Bruskewitz in March 1996 for promoting positions he deemed "totally incompatible with the Catholic faith".  The organizations include Call to Action, Catholics for a Free Choice, Planned Parenthood, the Hemlock Society, the Freemasons, and the Society of St. Pius X.  The Vatican later confirmed the excommunication of Call to Action members in November 2006, but in 2017, the current bishop of Lincoln met with leadership of the group and proposed a way for individuals to be reconciled to the Church, without having to renounce their membership in the organization, as long as they reaffirmed their commitment to all of Church teaching.
After Bishop Michael Cox consecrated Pat Buckley a bishop without papal approval, both were excommunicated.
Isabelo de los Reyes, founder of the Philippine Independent Church, was excommunicated by Pope Leo XIII in 1903 as a schismatic apostate.

21st century
 Bp. Rómulo Antonio Braschi on 5 August 2002 for having "attempted to confer priestly ordination on several Catholic women," the Danube Seven.
Chinese bishops Joseph Liu Xinhong, Joseph Ma Yinglin, John Wu Shi-zhen and Bernardine Dong Guangqing were excommunicated by the Holy See in 2006 for engaging in illicit episcopal consecrations  The two who received ordination (Liu Xinhong and Ma Yinglin) had their excommunications lifted when the Holy See announced that all bishops in China were formally recognized in 2018
Zambian bishop Emmanuel Milingo was stated to be excommunicated by the Holy See in 2006 after he engaged in illicit episcopal consecrations
 The Community of the Lady of All Nations for heretical teachings and beliefs after a six-year investigation. The declaration was announced by the Canadian Conference of Catholic Bishops on 12 September 2007.
 Fr. Dale Fushek (also laicized by Pope Benedict XVI in February 2010) and Fr. Mark Dippre. Former Priests were issued a Decree of Excommunication by Bishop Thomas J. Olmsted for operating "an opposing ecclesial community" in direct disobedience to orders to refrain from public ministry.
 Fr. Marek Bozek (since laicized by Pope Benedict XVI), and the lay parish board members of St. Stanislaus Kostka Church in St. Louis, Missouri in December 2005 were declared guilty of the ecclesiastical crime of schism by then-Archbishop Raymond Leo Burke. Their excommunication was ratified by the Vatican in May 2008. Four of the parish board members have since reconciled with the Church.
 Both the doctors and the mother of the nine-year-old victim in the 2009 Brazilian girl abortion case were said by Archbishop José Cardoso Sobrinho of Olinda and Recife to have incurred an automatic excommunication. The victim had an abortion after being raped and impregnated by her stepfather. The National Conference of Bishops of Brazil contradicted Sobrinho's statement: it declared that, in accordance with canon law, the girl's mother was not in fact excommunicated and that there were no grounds for stating that any of the doctors involved were in fact excommunicated. Disagreement with the Archbishop's view of the supposed excommunication was expressed also by other bishops.
 Sr. Margaret McBride, a nun, for allowing an abortion.  McBride later reconciled with the Church and is no longer living in a state of excommunication.
In 2011 Joseph Huang Bingzhang was excommunicated by the Holy See for illicitly receiving episcopal consecration to become bishop of Shantou.  His consecrators were not formally excommunicated and the Holy See noted that it was possible they were forced to take part, however, if they were not forced, they would have also suffered an automatic excommunication. This excommunication was lifted in 2018 when Pope Francis recognized all bishops in China.
Lei Shiyin was excommunicated in 2011 by the Holy See for receiving illicit episcopal consecration to become bishop of Leshan. His consecrators were not formally excommunicated because of the possibility that they were forced, however, they would suffer an automatic excommunication if they were not forced to participate. This excommunication was lifted in 2018 when Pope Francis recognized all bishops in China.
 In October 2012, the newspapers El Observador and El País reported that all the Catholics who promoted the abortion law in Uruguay were excommunicated. The newspaper Urgente24, in spite of a headline stating that what it called the "abortionist lawmakers" were excommunicated, explained in the body of the article that automatic excommunication applied only to someone who directly carried out an abortion. The bishops website also explained that excommunication would automatically apply, under Canon Law 1398, only to anyone carrying out an abortion, and not to lawmakers.
 Fr. Roy Bourgeois (also laicized and dismissed from the Maryknoll Fathers) for participating in the attempted ordination of a woman.
Yue Fusheng was excommunicated in 2012 by the Holy See for episcopal ordination to become bishop of Harbin.  His consecrators were not formally excommunicated because of the possibility they were forced, but they would suffer automatic excommunication if they had not been forced. This excommunication was lifted in 2018 when Pope Francis recognized all bishops in China.
 Fr. Robert Marrone on 6 March 2013 by Bishop Richard Gerard Lennon of the Roman Catholic Diocese of Cleveland in Cleveland, Ohio for violating the terms of his leave of absence. Marrone set up "an opposing ecclesial community" (the Community of St. Peter's) in a vacant warehouse that is not a Catholic church building and is outside of the authority of the Roman Catholic Diocese of Cleveland after St. Peter's Parish in Cleveland was closed (it has since been reopened), in direct disobedience to orders from the bishop.
 Fr. Simon Lokodo, The Minister for Ethics and Integrity in Uganda, was excommunicated from the Catholic Church by Pope Benedict XVI when he entered politics in violation of Canon Law 285.3
 Fr. Roberto Francisco Daniel, known by local community as "Father Beto", by Bishop Caetano Ferrari, from Bauru, Brazil. Daniel was excommunicated because he refused a direct order from his bishop to apologize for or retract his statement that love was possible between people of the same sex. The priest also said a married person who chose to have an affair, heterosexual or otherwise, would not be unfaithful as long as that person's spouse allowed it.
 Fr Greg Reynolds of Melbourne, Australia was excommunicated in 2013 for continuing to celebrate Mass when not permitted, advocating the attempted ordination of women, and promoting same-sex marriage.
 Fr. Jose Mercau in 2014 as part of the Catholic Church sexual abuse cases scandal.
 Samantha Hudson, Spanish drag artist, excommunicated in 2015 by the bishop of Mallorca for a controversial musical video about the alleged "oppression"  the LGBTQ+ community suffers due to the Catholic Church. The video was an Art school project, he was 15 years old at the time.
 In February 2018 Fr Ezinwanne Igbo, a Nigerian priest working on the Sunshine Coast of Queensland, Australia, incurred an automatic excommunication for breaking the seal of the confessional.
 On Christmas Eve, 2019, three hermits named Father Stephen de Kerdrel, Sister Colette Roberts and Brother Damon Kelly living in Scotland were excommunicated after accusing Pope Francis of heresy in an online statement.
 In July 2020, Tomislav Vlašić, a former director of the alleged seers of Our Lady in Medjugorje was excommunicated for holding himself out as a priest and simulating sacraments, after continuing to preach after being laicized for teaching false doctrine, manipulating consciences, disobeying ecclesiastical authority, and of committing acts of sexual misconduct.
 In August 2020, Fr. Jeremy Leatherby, a priest of the Diocese of Sacramento, incurred an automatic excommunication for schism after refusing to recognize the legitimacy of Pope Francis, most notably substituting his name with that of his predecessor Pope Benedict XVI and omitting the name of Bishop Jaime Soto during the Eucharistic Prayer while offering Mass.  Bishop Soto announced the excommunication on 7 August.
 Fr. Marko Ivan Rupnik, SJ in 2021 for absolution of an accomplice. Later lifted after he sought forgiveness from Pope Francis.

See also
List of cardinals excommunicated by the Catholic Church
Shunning#In religion
List of excommunicable offences in the Catholic Church
List of people executed in the Papal States

References

External links

Excommunicated